Special fine paper is a classification of paper used for copying and digital printing.

Copy paper 

Copy paper is used for copying and laser printers. The basis weight is 70-90 g/m2 (approximately 18-24 lb) and ISO brightness 80-96%. It is made of 90–100% virgin chemical pulp or 100% deinked pulp with total pigment content of 10-15%. The most important quality is smooth run in a copying machine / printer and good dimensional stability. It must not show curling or cockling, nor may it retain dust.

Digital printing paper 

Digital printing paper is also called electronic printing paper. The basis weight is 40-400 g/m2. This paper quality may be either coated or uncoated. The demands of the paper may vary substantially depending on printing method: electrical charge, thermal, magnetic or ink-jet. All require good dimensional stability, no curling or cockling, good surface strength and surface smoothness. For ink-jet paper it is also important with sufficient and uniform porosity to counteract spreading of the ink.

See also 

 Coated fine paper
 Inkjet paper
 Thermal paper

References 

Paper